Marie Bjerre (born 6 May 1986 in Viborg) is a Danish politician, who is a member of the Folketing for the Venstre political party. She was elected into the Folketing in the 2019 Danish general election, and re-elected in 2022.

Political career 
Bjerre was elected into the Folketing at the 2019 election, receiving 8,627 votes.

External links 
 Biography on the website of the Danish Parliament (Folketinget)

References 

1986 births
21st-century Danish women politicians
Living people
Members of the Folketing 2019–2022
Members of the Folketing 2022–2026
People from Viborg Municipality
Venstre (Denmark) politicians
Women members of the Folketing